Olufunmilayo Aduni Olayinka, née Famuagun (20 June 1960 – 6 April 2013),
was a Nigerian banker and politician who served as the deputy governor of Ekiti State.

Early life and education
Olayinka was born in Ado-Ekiti, Ekiti State. She attended Holy Trinity Grammar School Ibadan, where she obtained her first school leaving certificate with distinction. She subsequently proceeded to Olivet Baptist High School, Oyo State, Nigeria, where she obtained her Higher School Certificate (HSC). She held a master's degree in public administration and a Bachelor of Business Administration marketing from Central State University, Wilberforce, Ohio, United States, in 1981 and 1983 respectively. She was three times winner of the Dean's Honour roll.

Career
Olayinka, a marketing analyst and strategist, started her career in banking with First Bank of Nigeria Plc in 1986. She later worked as relationship manager for corporate accounts in Access Bank, the now defunct Merchant Banking Corporation [MBC] and United Bank for Africa Plc.

In August 2002, she started working in corporate communications and proceeded to head the Corporate Affairs Division, United Bank for Africa. She later became head of brand management and corporate affairs, thereby leading the team responsible for delivering a compelling brand proposition and re-branding of the United Bank for Africa which helped to drive the bank's business strategy and added value to the total image of the brand.

Olayinka was also the second vice president of the Association of Corporate Managers of Banks between 2002 and 2004.

Olayinka played a strategic role during the merger process of the erstwhile United Bank for Africa & Standard Trust Bank, where she co-chaired the Branding Sub-Committee. She also served as a key member of the Media Relations Sub-Committee.

Until her election as the deputy governor of Ekiti State, she was head of corporate services, Ecobank Transatlantic Inc., where she was responsible for communicating the bank's activities to the public, relationship management with the public and providing feedback to management as it relates to the total image of the bank. In addition, she also oversaw the General Internal Services Unit with responsibility for overall co-ordination of administrative services for the entire bank.

Election
Following a disputed election process during the 2007 Gubernatorial elections, the candidate of Nigeria's ruling People's Democratic Party, Segun Oni was declared winner of that election. Whereupon Olayinka in conjunction with Kayode Fayemi headed to court to contest the veracity of the results. On 14 October 2010, after a -year prolonged re-election process and court battle, an Elections Appeal Tribunal sitting in Ilorin, Kwara State, Nigeria sacked former governor Segun Oni of the Peoples Democratic Party (PDP) and declared Dr Kayode Fayemi of the Action Congress of Nigeria (ACN) as the new governor of Ekiti State.
Mrs Olufunmilayo Olayinka was subsequently sworn in as the substantive deputy governor of Ekiti State by virtue of her existing role as the running mate of Dr Kayode Fayemi during the 2007 governorship elections. She is only the second woman in the history of Ekiti State to occupy the position of deputy governor of the state. She was a member of the Action Congress of Nigeria.

Death
Olayinka died in the evening of 6 April 2013 after a long battle with cancer and she was laid to rest in Ado-Ekiti.

Olayinka was a devout Christian; she was survived by her aged mother, husband and their three children.

References

External links 
 ekiti.com

Yoruba women in politics
Nigerian women in politics
Nigerian politicians
1960 births
Central State University alumni
2013 deaths
Deaths from cancer in Nigeria
People from Ekiti State
Burials in Ekiti State
Nigerian bankers
Yoruba bankers
Nigerian Christians
Olivet Baptist High School alumni
Yoruba women in business